Lodge Road is a cricket ground in Coleraine, Northern Ireland and the home of Coleraine Cricket Club. In 1987, it hosted a first-class match between Ireland and Scotland, a match which ended in a draw.

In 2011, it was one of the venues for the 2011 ICC Under-19 Cricket World Cup Qualifier.

References

External links
Lodge Road, Coleraine at CricketArchive

Cricket grounds in Northern Ireland
Coleraine
Sports venues in County Londonderry